Dyscolia is a genus of brachiopods belonging to the family Dyscoliidae.

The species of this genus are found in all oceans.

Species:

Dyscolia johannisdavisi 
Dyscolia radiata 
Dyscolia subquadrata 
Dyscolia wyvillei

References

Brachiopod genera